A colonnade is an architectural feature.
Colonnade  may also refer to:

 Third-generation GM A platform vehicles made by General Motors from 1973 to 1977, known as the "Colonnade" style.
 Centro Colonnades, shopping centre
 Colonnade Apartments, Mis van de Rohe building in Newark
 Colonnade Hotel, London
 Colonnade (Fabergé egg)
 Colonnade Row
 Colonnades Leisure Park, retail park and entertainment complex
 Colonnade at State College, shopping center
 I-5 Colonnade
 Louvre Colonnade
 Mill Colonnade
 Swinton Colonnade
 The Evening Colonnade
 25 North Colonnade
 Colonnade (restaurant), a historic restaurant in Tampa, Florida
 The Colonnade, a freehold condominium development in Singapore
The Colonnades, condominium buildings in Atlanta's Virginia-Highland neighborhood